Juan Pablo Isidoro Guanipa Villalobos (born 20 December 1964) is a Venezuelan lawyer and politician who currently serves as deputy and First Vice President of the National Assembly, leader of the Justice First political party and former governor of Zulia. He was a presidential candidate in the 2018 elections until boycott. Guanipa is the regional coordinator of the Justice First party in Zulia and chairs the Maracaibo Posible foundation.

Personal life

Early years 
He is the third of seven brothers, six boys and one woman, children of: Corina Villalobos de Guanipa and father Manuel Guanipa Matos, a Zulian politician, leader of Copei. At 13 years he worked as a clerk in a bookstore, where his young age stood out receiving recognition as owner of the best store clerk. He is the brother of Tomás Guanipa, also a deputy for Zulia and Secretary General of Justice First.

He served as a student leader and union representative of the employees of the Judicial District of Zulia.

Education 
He studied Basic and Diversified Education at the Liceo Los Robles de Maracaibo and graduated as a Bachelor of Humanities from the Colegio San Vicente de Paúl.

He is a lawyer, graduated from the University of Zulia in 1990. After receiving the university degree, he continued a rigorous training process in the political and community area, as well as in the area of public management, citizen participation and leadership.

In 1991, he completed the IV International Senior Management Course offered by the Latin American Institute for Social Research in Caracas. In 1997, he participated in the Leadership and Vision Program offered by the Center for the Dissemination of Economic Knowledge (CEDICE) in Caracas. In the same year, he studied the Advanced Program of Government Sciences and Techniques sponsored by the Institute of Higher Administration Studies (IESA) in Maracaibo.

In 2002, he completed the Master in Applied Political Studies offered by the International Foundation for Ibero-America of Administration and Public Policies in Madrid, Spain, obtaining with cum laude honors.

Political career 
Guanipa joined politics with Rafael Caldera's presidential campaign in the 1983 presidential election, thereby entering the Copei party.

He was elected as a deputy to the Legislative Assembly of the Zulia State by Copei for the period 1994–1996, serving as President of the Legislation and Policy Commissions and as Vice President of the Sports, Recreation and Tourism and Regional Planning and Development Commissions. From February 1999 to March 2003, he served as General Director of the Regional Institute for Training and Sociopolitical and Sociocultural Studies for the Promotion of Man (IRFES), an institution located in Maracaibo, Zulia State. After the 1999 constitutional process, leaving Copei and from 2003 is part of Primero Justicia.

He was popularly elected as Alternate Deputy to the National Assembly for the period 2000–2005. He was popularly elected to carry out the position of Councilor of the Maracaibo Municipality in the period 2005–2009, but his performance extended for a further period, until 2013, as a consequence of the electoral body not calling the respective process. During that time he chaired the Legislation and Drafting Commission of that legislative body.

During the 2015 Venezuelan parliamentary election, he was elected as a deputy for his home state, Zulia. 

He served as a councilor of Maracaibo for two continuous periods between 2005 and 2013. In 2015, he was elected deputy to the Venezuelan National Assembly until the end of 2017 when he separated from office to run as governor, where he was elected, however, unable to assuming his mandate before the refusal of the Zulia State Legislative Council (CLEZ) of an official majority to swear him in because he did not subordinate himself to the ANC (by the same request of this instance that was called and installed controversially), he returns to his seat in the national parliament in 2018. After that, the president of the CLEZ of the time Magdely Valbuena was appointed interim governor until new elections were held, which were scheduled for December 2017, where the official candidate Omar Prieto is elected.

2017 regional elections 

Guanipa was a candidate for governor of his state, a place that got winning the primary election of officers of the Unit, facing the mayor of Maracaibo, Eveling Trejo de Rosales on 10 September 2017.

On 15 October 2017, during the regional elections, he was elected Governor of the Zulia state, declared the winner with 691,547 votes and 51.06%. Arias Cárdenas, his opponent obtained 631,594 votes.

Dismissal as Governor of Zulia 
On 27 October 2017, the Legislative Council of Zulia dismissed Guanipa as the governor and Magdely Valbuena was appointed as interim governor. The council declared that Guanipa; "By not taking the oath, he creates the absolute lack of office."

2018 presidential election 

On 26 January 2018, his brother and secretary general of Primero Justicia, Tomás Guanipa, communicated the possibility that Juan Pablo Guanipa was the party's presidential candidate – despite the fact that he could nominate Henrique Capriles Radonski for the third time in future elections of the Democratic Unity Roundtable (MUD) primaries.  Guanipa declared in November 2017 would not rule out taking such responsibility within PJ and compete for the nomination of the opposition coalition.  However, on 19 February 2018, Justice First (PJ), Democratic Action and Popular Will (VP), announced they would not participate in presidential elections and expressed their rejection of the National Electoral Council, ruling out any intention of Guanipa in the electoral race.

2020 Venezuelan National Assembly Delegated Committee election 

Alternate deputy of Guanipa, José Sánchez "Mazuco", announced in the day of the election that he was operated and hospitalized, so he would not be able to attend to the session, but assured that his vote would not make a difference since the main deputy Guanipa would attend instead.

After being blocked from entering the Palacio Federal Legislativo on 5 January 2020, Juan Guaidó announced that a separate session of the National Assembly would happen in the building of El Nacional, a Venezuelan newspaper. National Assembly deputies signed their names on an attendance list upon entering the facility. Several deputies abroad followed and endorsed the vote remotely from Madrid, Spain.

References 

1964 births
Living people
People from Maracaibo
Justice First politicians
Members of the National Assembly (Venezuela)
People of the Crisis in Venezuela
University of Zulia alumni
20th-century Venezuelan lawyers
Venezuelan city councillors
Copei politicians
Governors of Zulia